The Central District of Zaveh County is a district (bakhsh) in Zaveh County, Razavi Khorasan Province, Iran. At the 2006 census, its population was 38,874, in 9,557 families.  The District has one city: Dowlatabad. The District has two rural districts (dehestan): Safaiyeh Rural District and Zaveh Rural District.

References

Districts of Razavi Khorasan Province
Zaveh County